Bruce McBarnette  is a masters high jumper and has broken world records for his age group. He has won 12 world championships and 35 USA Track and Field Masters National Championships. He was inducted into the USATF Masters Hall of Fame in 2009. He is also a television actor.

Early life
McBarnette is the son of Yvette Francis-McBarnette and Olvin R. McBarnette. He graduated from Princeton University and New York University School of Law. He also served as a Captain in the United States Army.

References

1958 births
Living people
American male television actors
American masters athletes
New York University School of Law alumni
Princeton University alumni
Track and field athletes from Virginia
United States Army officers